Mimoun Oaïssa (born 11 March 1975) is a Moroccan-Dutch actor and screenwriter.

Education and career
He was born in Beni Said, Nador Province, Morocco and graduated from Amsterdam Theatre School in 1999 and followed acting lessons abroad. He was a stage actor from 1998 till 2001 and then quit to start acting on screen. His major films include Hush Hush Baby and Schnitzel Paradise. For his role in the latter he won the 2005 Golden Calf Award for Best Supporting Actor.

Filmography

Film
1994 De andere kant van de tunnel (The Other End of the Tunnel)
1996 De Jurk (The Dress)
1996 Marrakech
2001 De Vriendschap
2002 De enclave (The Enclave)
2003 So be it
2003 Polleke
2004 Shouf Shouf Habibi! (Hush Hush Baby)
2005 Het schnitzelparadijs (Schnitzel Paradise)
2007 Weddings and Beheadings
2007 Kicks
2008 Lezione 21
2009 Amsterdam
2011 The Devil's Double (Ali)
2012 De Marathon (The Marathon) (Youssoef)
2015 De Masters (Aziz)

Television
1999 Novellen: De dag, de nacht en het duister (Novellas: The Day, The Night and The Darkness)
1999 Quidam, Quidam
2000 Russen (Russians; Bargoens for inspector)
2001 Wet & Waan (Law and Delusion)
2002 De vloer op (To The Floor)
2002 Polonaise
2002 Kwartelhof
2002 Intensive Care
2003 Dwaalgast (Wanderguest)
2005 Costa!
2005 Spoorloos verdwenen (Lost without a trace)
2006 Rauw (Raw)
2006–2009 Shouf shouf! (Hush Hush)

References

External links

1975 births
Living people
Dutch male actors
Dutch male film actors
Dutch male television actors
Golden Calf winners
Dutch people of Riffian descent
Moroccan emigrants to the Netherlands
People from Nador
20th-century Dutch male actors
21st-century Dutch male actors
Dutch male stage actors